Kwan Yoke Meng KMN (born 11 January 1966) is a former badminton player from Malaysia. He is currently the Malaysia national junior under-13 singles coach.

Achievement

IBF World Grand Prix 
The World Badminton Grand Prix sanctioned by International Badminton Federation (IBF) from 1983 to 2006.

Men's singles

Honour
  :
 Officer of the Order of the Defender of the Realm (K.M.N.) (1992)

References

1966 births
Living people
Malaysian sportspeople of Chinese descent
Sportspeople from Kuala Lumpur
Malaysian male badminton players
Southeast Asian Games medalists in badminton
Southeast Asian Games gold medalists for Malaysia
Southeast Asian Games bronze medalists for Malaysia
Competitors at the 1991 Southeast Asian Games
Badminton coaches
Asian Games medalists in badminton
Badminton players at the 1986 Asian Games
Badminton players at the 1990 Asian Games
Asian Games silver medalists for Malaysia
Medalists at the 1990 Asian Games